Mercer is an unincorporated census-designated place located in the town of Mercer, Iron County, Wisconsin, United States. Mercer has a post office with ZIP code 54547. As of the 2010 census, its population is 516.

Mercer identifies itself as the "Loon Capital of the World" in order to promote tourism. This is based on a wildlife study that found Mercer had the highest concentration of common loons in the world. Mercer also hosts an annual "Loon Day" festival, which features a large arts and crafts fair, live music and a loon calling contest.

History
A post office called Mercer has been in operation since 1895. The community was probably named for Hugh Mercer, a general in the American Revolutionary War.

Tourism
Mercer's main industry is seasonal tourism, which is based on the large amount of undeveloped land and secluded waterways. Summer activities include boating, fishing, biking, hiking, and swimming. Summer tourism is often based on the Turtle-Flambeau Flowage and other bodies of water, such as Tank Lake (Grand Portage Lake), former home to weekly water ski shows and site of a public beach. Fishing and other water sports include water skiing and jet skiing. Autumn and winter recreation includes snowmobiling, skiing, and hunting.

Mercer is home to the Mercer Area Historical Society housed in the former train station; it contains a small museum of local history.  Other buildings include a jail, schoolhouse, barbershop, and a reconstructed caboose.

Images

References

Census-designated places in Iron County, Wisconsin
Census-designated places in Wisconsin